Bakkt Holdings, Inc. is an American corporation listed on the New York Stock Exchange under the ticker symbol BKKT. The company operates a technology platform for the management of digital assets. The platform includes an app where consumers can view and transact with assets including cryptocurrencies, loyalty and rewards points, airline miles, and gift cards. The service also includes a cryptocurrency exchange and wallet. Bakkt was founded and is majority-owned by American Fortune 500 company Intercontinental Exchange, Inc., the parent organization of the New York Stock Exchange.

History under ICE ownership (2018-2020) 

In August 2018, Intercontinental Exchange announced it was forming a new company Bakkt, which was intended to leverage Microsoft online servers to manage digital assets. Bakkt was said to be working with Boston Consulting Group (BCG), Microsoft, Starbucks, and others to create a software platform. The Bakkt ecosystem is expected to include federally regulated markets and warehousing along with merchant and consumer applications. Its first use cases was for trading and conversion of Bitcoin (BTC) versus fiat currencies. Kelly Loeffler served as Bakkt's CEO until her appointment to the United States Senate.

As an initial component of the Bakkt offering, Intercontinental Exchange's U.S.-based futures exchange and clearing house plan to launch a one-day physically delivered BTC contract along with physical warehousing in 2019, subject to CFTC review and approval, which was delayed. These regulated venues will establish new protocols for managing the specific security and settlement requirements of digital currencies. In addition, the clearing house plans to create a separate guarantee fund that will be funded by Bakkt.

In January 2019, Bakkt announced that it had entered into an agreement to acquire certain assets of Rosenthal Collins Group (RCG), to close in February. In April 2019, Bakkt announced that it had acquired Digital Asset Custody Company (DACC). Terms of the transaction have not been disclosed. In September 2019 the exchange began trading of bitcoin futures. In February 2020, ICE announced that it agreed to acquire Bridge2 Solutions, a leading provider of loyalty solutions for merchants and consumers. Following the completion of the transaction, Bakkt plans to acquire Bridge2 Solutions from ICE using proceeds from Bakkt's Series B round of funding.

In September 2020, Bakkt announced a new all-time high for trade volume in physically delivered Bitcoin futures contracts. During the September 15th session, this figure amounted to 15,955 BTC (more than $200 million at the time of announcement).

Separation from ICE as a publicly listed company (2021-) 

In January 2021, Bakkt announced that it would become a publicly traded company via a merger with VPC Impact Acquisition Holdings, a special purpose acquisition company sponsored by Victory Park Capital (“VPC”). The newly combined company will be renamed Bakkt Holdings, Inc. and will be listed on the New York Stock Exchange, where the business combination between Bakkt and VIH values the combined company at an enterprise value of approximately $2.1 billion. Intercontinental Exchange will retain a 65% economic interest.

In October 2021, Bakkt announced it had completed its merger with VPC Impact Acquisition Holdings (NASDAQ: VIH), and will begin trading as a public company on the New York Stock Exchange on Monday, October 18, under the ticker “BKKT”. Intercontinental Exchange (ICE) maintains an approximately 68% economic interest and a minority voting interest in the combined company. The investment will be reclassified as an equity method investment of ICE and will therefore not be consolidated within ICE’s financial statements. The earnings of equity method investments are excluded from ICE’s adjusted non-GAAP results.

In November 2022, it was announced Bakkt would be acquiring the Chicago-based integrated crypto trading platform, Apex Crypto, LLC from Apex Fintech Solutions, Inc.

Strategic partnerships 
The company plans to grow its user base through partnerships with other businesses. Examples include Starbucks, whose customers can monetize digital assets such as bitcoin using the Bakkt app and load the value onto their Starbucks Cards. Members of Choice Hotels and Wyndham Hotels' rewards programs can convert unused hotel points to cash, bitcoin, and other digital assets with the Bakkt app. Through the Bakkt platform, Mastercard will enable banks and merchants to issue cards that let people pay with bitcoin and earn cryptocurrency rewards.

References

External links 

 Business data for Bakkt Holdings, Inc.: Yahoo Finance  SEC filings

Companies listed on the New York Stock Exchange
2018 establishments in Georgia (U.S. state)
American companies established in 2018
Financial services companies of the United States
Bitcoin companies